Munich Leuchtenbergring is a railway station on the Munich–Salzburg line in the Bogenhausen quarter of Munich, Germany. It is an elevated station above the Leuchtenbergring, part of Munich's Mittlerer Ring road system. The station serves both the Eastern part of Bogenhausen (north of the railway tracks) and the western part of Berg am Laim (south of the tracks).

The station is served by bus line 59. The tram station Ampfingstraße on line  is nearby.

Places nearby 
 München Ostbahnhof
 Prinzregentenstraße
 Prinzregententheater

References

Leuchtenbergring
Leuchtenbergring
Railway stations in Germany opened in 1972